The New York Institute of Technology (NYIT or New York Tech) is a private research university founded in 1955. It has two main campuses in New York—one in Old Westbury, on Long Island, and one in Manhattan. Additionally, it has a cybersecurity research lab and a biosciences, bioengineering lab in Old Westbury, as well as campuses in Arkansas, United Arab Emirates, China, and Canada.

The New York Institute of Technology Computer Graphics Lab is an important environment in the history of computer graphics and animation, as founders of Pixar and Lucasfilm began their research there.

Overview
New York Institute of Technology has five schools and two colleges, all with an emphasis on technology and applied scientific research: School of Architecture and Design, School of Interdisciplinary Studies and Education, School of Engineering and Computing Sciences, School of Health Professions, School of Management, College of Arts and Sciences and College of Osteopathic Medicine.

New York Tech offers a full range of undergraduate, master's, and doctoral programs. The institute currently offers five doctoral degree programs, and has plans of offering more doctoral degree programs in the near future. NYIT is the birthplace of entirely 3D CGI films. As of 2020, two Turing Award winners have been affiliated with the university.

As of 2018, New York Tech enrolls 9,930 full-time students across its campuses worldwide. In its 2023 rankings of Colleges & Universities, U.S. News & World Report listed NYIT as a "selective" university with an acceptance rate of 80%.

History

Foundation and vision

In 1955, New York Institute of Technology opened under a provisional charter granted by the New York State Board of Regents to NYIT. Its first campus opened at 500 Pacific Street in the Borough of Brooklyn, New York. The founders of NYIT, and in particular, Alexander Schure, started NYIT with the mission of offering career-oriented professional education, providing all qualified students access to opportunity, and supporting applications-oriented research. Schure later served as NYIT's first president. In the higher education community at the time, a debate arose around the concern that humanities studies would be overshadowed by too much emphasis on science and engineering. NYIT's goal was to create a balance between science/engineering and a liberal arts education, and ever since, it has been focusing on this model to prepare students for current and future careers.

By the 1958–1959 academic year, the university had 300 students, and the time had come to expand its physical operations. In April 1958, the college purchased the Pythian Temple at 135–145 W. 70th St. in Manhattan for its main center. The building, adjacent to the planned Lincoln Center for the Performing Arts, was an ornate 12-story structure with a columned entranceway. Built in 1929 at a cost of $2 million, it included among its features a 1,200-seat auditorium. In 1958, NYIT sponsored the first National Technology Awards, created by Frederick Pittera, an organizer of international fairs and a member of the NYIT Board of Trustees, to help raise funds for the NYIT science and technology laboratories. The awards, held at the Waldorf-Astoria Hotel, were attended by several hundred guests, with entertainment provided by the U.S. Air Force Band. 36th President of the United States Lyndon Johnson was the keynote speaker. His speech was broadcast nationally by the ABC Radio Network. Among the honorees were Dr. Wernher von Braun and Major General Bernard Schriever, Commanding General of the Ballistic Air Command. Photos, press clippings, and audio tapes of the event are on view at the Lyndon Johnson Library at Austin, Texas.

Distinction through technology

Teaching Machines
In 1959, NYIT introduced “teaching machines” for student instruction in physics, electronics, and mathematics. NYIT also pioneered the use of mainframes as a teaching tool, having received its first, donated by the CIT Financial Corporation, in 1965. The curriculum was successful enough that NYIT received two grants totaling approximately $3 million from the federal government – one to develop a system of individualized learning through the use of computers; the other to develop a computer-based course in general physics for midshipmen at the United States Naval Academy in Annapolis, Md.

NYIT Computer Graphics Lab
In 1974, New York Institute of Technology Computer Graphics Lab was established and attracted the likes of: Pixar Animation Studios president Edwin Catmull and co-founder Alvy Ray Smith; Walt Disney Feature Animation Chief Scientist Lance Williams; DreamWorks animator Hank Grebe; and Netscape and Silicon Graphics founder James H. Clark. Researchers at the New York Institute of Technology Computer Graphics Lab created the tools that made entirely 3D CGI films possible. NYIT CG Lab was regarded as the top computer animation research and development group in the world during the late 70s and early 80s.

Clean Air Road Rally
In 1995, the NYIT School of Engineering took first place in the U.S. Department of Energy's Clean Air Road Rally. The student engineering team spent three years designing and building the high-performance hybrid electric car that beat 43 other vehicles. In 1998, NYIT opened its first international program in China. In 1999, Bill Gates spoke at NYIT and received NYIT's Presidential Medal. In 2002, NYIT installed the fastest broadband network on the East Coast.

The 21st century
 In 2003, NYIT opened its Bahrain site to students seeking an American-style education in the Middle East. 
 In 2005, NYIT participated in its first Solar Decathlon, an international competition sponsored by the U.S. Department of Energy. NYIT was one of nineteen colleges internationally and the only school in the New York metropolitan area. The team, composed of students and faculty, captured fifth place honors. 
 In 2007, NYIT co-hosted the International Energy Conference and Exhibition in Daegu, South Korea. 
 In 2007 the university received $500,000 in federal funding to develop a "green print" initiative to research alternative fuel technology and determine its carbon footprint. 
 In 2008, NYIT installed a 3-D motion capture lab for its Fine Arts program in Old Westbury. The system allows the university to use technology to teach the next generation of computer animators. 
 In 2008 NYIT was awarded a $130,000 research contract by United Space Alliance to help NASA scientists design the crew module of the Orion spacecraft using 3-D motion capture technology. NYIT's College of Osteopathic Medicine also uses 3-D motion capture technology to help doctors better identify mobility and stability problems in patients with Parkinson's disease. 
 In July 2008 NYIT sponsored the first annual International Water Conference at the United Nations in New York City. The event brought together representatives from non-governmental organizations, international corporations, and universities to discuss the need to safeguard the planet's water resources. 
 In 2009 NYIT sponsored its second U.N. event, the International Energy Conference (Aug. 31-Sept. 1, 2009) to welcome energy secretaries, policy makers, and executives from multinational companies to examine opportunities and innovations in the field of sustainable technology. 
 NYIT closed its campuses in Jordan and Bahrain in 2013 and 2014 respectively. NYIT had to close its campus in Bahrain because the Higher Education Council of Bahrain decided to come up with a new set of regulations, aiming to standardize all private universities in Bahrain. NYIT could not adapt to the changes like the other local universities in Bahrain, as all NYIT campuses around the world must follow the same American standard programs, otherwise they would be threatened to lose their international license and accreditation.

Strategic plan
From 2000 to 2015, NYIT invested in initiatives to enhance the quality of the university, including campus infrastructure, a larger faculty, new endowed chairs and professorships. The money came from federal grants, New York state grants, and National Science Foundation grants, as well as university funding and contributions from alumni, corporations and foundations. For example, in 2002, federal government awarded NYIT $0.3 million for a new cyber security lab, in 2009, NYIT received a multimillion-dollar donation from Lumeta Corporation, in 2011, NYIT received a $0.16 million grant from the Verizon Foundation, in 2013, NYIT received $1.4 million in state and federal grants for a portion of the costs required for constructing NYIT's new $4 million Entrepreneurship Technology Innovation Center, in 2014, NYIT received a $0.23 million National Science Foundation grant to purchase a sputtering machine, used in the electronics and medical fields to create thin film sensors, and in 2015, NYIT received from New York State a grant of $0.4 million for a portion of the costs required to renovate a 5,300-square-foot facility to house three new laboratories on its Old Westbury campus.

Some of the steps taken in the 2015–2016 academic year in implementing the strategic plan include: 
 continuation of annual installments of smart classrooms and video wall installations, 
 continuation of investing in technology in laboratories and studios, 
 installment of clean-room sputtering machine inside the Entrepreneurship Technology Innovation Center in fall 2015, 
 mobile-first website unveiled in January 2016, 
 continuation of adding 3D printers across departments, 
 adding laser scanners capable of measuring surface morphology in 3D, 
 adding I-DEXA full body scanners, 
 new Quark C-PET Metabolic Testing Systems that will enable to assess the physiological response to exercise in the medical school, 
 investing in infrastructure upgrades for wireless technology, 
 starting construction of residence halls, a dining facility, an academic building and executive offices on the Old Westbury campus, 
 opening a new campus in Arkansas that will conduct research and offer graduate-level education and degrees such as Doctor of Osteopathic Medicine (D.O.), Master of Science in Medical/Health Care Simulation, and Master of Science in Neuromusculoskeletal Sciences, among others. 
 In 2017, NYIT opened a cybersecurity lab in Old Westbury, the first lab on Long Island designated as a National Center of Academic Excellence in Cyber Defense by the National Security Agency and the Department of Homeland Security.

Campuses

Old Westbury 

It encompasses numerous contiguous former estates situated in the beautiful wooded hillsides of Old Westbury, New York. Some of these estates were formerly owned by members of the Rockefeller family. Opened in 1965, the campus has many buildings including a sports complex, administrative and academic buildings, a 100-seat "smart" auditorium, several dining halls, a bookstore, as well as NYIT's de Seversky Mansion, a party and event venue on Long Island, and one of the largest houses in the United States. It was developed on and around the nucleus of the former C. V. Whitney estate and includes several former North Shore estates. Original buildings have been reconstructed for educational use while retaining the charm of traditional exteriors. To preserve the natural beauty of the landscape, other buildings are clustered in low, modern structures surrounded by trees and open vistas. Classroom buildings and parking areas are connected by walkways through woods and meadows untouched by construction. Plazas connect classroom buildings and act as outdoor rooms for students and faculty. Concerts, lectures, and informal
recreational events are frequently scheduled on campus.

Athletic facilities at the Old Westbury campus include the 1,000-seat President's Stadium, the President's Field, the 500-seat Recreation Hall arena, the NYIT Softball Complex and the NYIT Tennis Complex consisting of six courts. Many notable people, including Patch Adams, spoke at Riland Auditorium on its Long Island campus. The Old Westbury campus is mainly a commuter campus, although residential students have dormitory options.

Long Island campus is also home to the New York Institute of Technology College of Osteopathic Medicine, the only osteopathic medical school on Long Island, which was formerly named New York College of Osteopathic Medicine, or NYCOM. In 2008, NYIT installed a 3-D motion capture lab for its Fine Arts program in Old Westbury. The system allows the university to use Hollywood technology to teach the next generation of computer animators. Between 2009 and 2013, the Old Westbury campus has undergone a number of significant improvements, including renovation of the 3,000 sf. Student Activities Center, creation of a Life Sciences biomedical research laboratory, renovation of Engineering Materials lab, creation of a Nursing Simulation lab and creation of an 8,000 sf. Entrepreneurship and Technology Innovation Center, among others.

In 2014, New York Tech announced a $93 million plan to erect seven new buildings on its Old Westbury campus, including four, four-story residence halls. In 2015, NYIT received from New York State a grant for a portion of the costs required to renovate a 5,300-square-foot facility to house three new laboratories on its Old Westbury campus. According to Bloomberg/Businessweek, in 2011, Old Westbury is the second "richest" town in the United States, trailing behind only Palm Beach, Florida. The magazine previously dubbed the town "New York's wealthiest suburb."

New York City
The New York City campus is located between 60th and 62nd streets on Broadway, adjacent to Columbus Circle, across the street from Central Park and within walking distance of Lincoln Center for the Performing Arts. Its central location is accessible via subway and bus routes and is close to concert halls, theaters, museums, and libraries. It is served by public transit buses and the A, B, C, D, and 1 Subway trains, which are accessed at the 59th Street/Columbus Circle station. Free weekday shuttles between the Long Island Railroad (LIRR) stations in Manhasset and Hicksville and the Long Island campus are available to all NYIT students, faculty, and staff. While it offers a full range of classes in all of NYIT's major schools, the majority of students enroll in programs that concentrate in media, communications, business, computer science, and engineering.

The campus comprises six buildings (excluding the residence halls):
 Edward Guiliano Global Center, 1855 Broadway, 
 The New Technology Building, 16 W. 61st Street,
 26 W. 61st Street,
 The Student Activities Building, 1849 Broadway,
 NYIT Auditorium on Broadway, 1871 Broadway,
 33 W. 60th street

The Student Activity Building, 1849 Broadway, has a student lounge, recreation areas, food services, a bookstore, and the offices of the Student Government Association as well as other clubs and student organizations. The Office of Student Activities is located on the second floor. The NYIT Auditorium on Broadway has a seating capacity of 268. The offices of Counseling and Wellness Services, Disability Services, Campus Life, Career Services, Student Employment, and Housing and Residential Life, are located at 26 West 61st Street. In 2014, NYIT opened a simulated trading floor, equipped with the latest technologies, including hardware, software, databases and datafeeds, on the fifth floor of the 26 W. 61st Street building. The Student Solutions Center (Enrollment Services, Bursar, Financial Aid, and Registrar) and International Education are located in the New Technology Building, 16 West 61st Street.

The New York City campus is home to student clubs and organizations such as Students Working to Achieve Greatness, Phi Iota Alpha, the Allied Health Life Science Organization, Bear Hug Club, Student Nurses Association, Dance Club, American Medical Student Association, Student Programming Association, Society of Hosteurs, and American Institute for Architecture Students.

Residential students have two dormitory options for the Manhattan campus: Riverside Terrace Residence Hall, and the Anderson Residence Hall at Manhattan School of Music (shared with Columbia University, Barnard College, and several other academic institutions), all of which are supervised by full-time staff.

NYIT Auditorium on Broadway, currently closed, hosts events, including the Lumen Prize Exhibition, and the SAG-AFTRA Foundation's Conversation Series, bringing in celebrities such as Carey Mulligan, Gloria Steinem, Meryl Streep, Mark Ruffalo and Leslee Udwin, among others, to NYIT's campus in Manhattan. NYIT Auditorium on Broadway has 3-D screening capabilities.  In January 2020, the auditorium was flooded and suffered substantial damage after a water main under the adjacent street ruptured.

Recruiters from major companies such as Google visit the Manhattan campus regularly for luncheons with students and information sessions.

Central Islip
New York Tech purchased more than 500 acres of the former Central Islip Psychiatric Center in 1984 to establish a campus in Suffolk County, New York. Less than 10 years later, the school began selling pieces off for commercial use. In 2005, NYIT ceased operations as a full college campus there. At one point, the location included residence halls with student lounges and laundry facilities, dining hall, classroom buildings, and library. The school still operates its 7,000-square-foot Central Islip Family Medical Center, located near the former campus, to serve the local community.

Jonesboro, Arkansas
In March 2014, NYIT announced plans to open an osteopathic medical school site in Jonesboro, Arkansas, by acquiring and renovating a building belonging to Arkansas State University-Jonesboro, for approximately $13 million. The distinctive three-story yellow brick building, the Wilson Hall at Arkansas State University, once housed Arkansas State University's library, auditorium (complete with balcony seating), and administrative offices as well as the laboratories, kitchens, studios, sewing rooms, classrooms and offices that served all departments of the arts and sciences. In April 2015, Commission on Osteopathic College Accreditation awarded initial approval for the osteopathic medical school site in Jonesboro, Arkansas. Renovations have already started at the 86,000-square-foot Wilson Hall to prepare for the new site. NYIT started hiring faculty members for the new site. In December 2015, NYIT's College of Osteopathic Medicine received final approval from Commission on Osteopathic College Accreditation to recruit students, open a second location on the campus of Arkansas State University in August 2016 and become the first osteopathic medical school in Arkansas.

Other facilities
NYIT formerly had research centers in Florida. In 2011, NYIT's College of Osteopathic Medicine opened a Family Health Care Center in Central Islip, New York, and in 2014, NYIT's College of Osteopathic Medicine opened another Family Health Care Center in Uniondale, New York. NYIT opened a cybersecurity center in Old Westbury, New York in 2017.; NYIT's College of Osteopathic Medicine has clinical affiliations with the following hospitals:

Global programs
In addition to its United States locations, New York Institute of Technology has a presence in the following countries:

United Arab Emirates
NYIT-Abu Dhabi campus lies in the Center of Excellence for Applied Research and Training (CERT) Technology Park, home to international companies such as Intel, Honeywell and Lucent Technologies. It is a modern university facility adjacent to Abu Dhabi Men's College. The classrooms feature technologies such as smartboards and high-tech computers. NYIT-Abu Dhabi has a library collection, catering services and parking facilities. Notable people who spoke at NYIT-Abu Dhabi include U.S. Secretary of Education Margaret Spellings.

China

Nanjing
NYIT-Nanjing was established in collaboration with Nanjing University of Posts and Telecommunications. NYIT-Nanjing students have access to Nanjing University of Posts and Telecommunications residence halls, dining facilities, and activities. NYIT's campus is separate but joined with the campus of Nanjing University of Posts and Telecommunications. The courses are taught in English, and students get the equivalent of an American degree without the expense of traveling abroad. Graduates have an option to earn 'parallel degrees' from NYIT and NUPT or, if they choose, just the NYIT degree. Students can study solely in Nanjing or can opt to take some of their courses at NYIT campuses in New York. Enrollment at NYIT-Nanjing is projected to eventually reach 6,000.

Beijing
Faculty of International Media of Communication University of China (commonly referred to as ICUC) is a Ministry of Education in China-approved Media Technology Center that NYIT launched with the Communication University of China in Beijing in 2015. It is the first China-foreign, cooperatively-run institution in media approved by the Ministry of Education. It offers dual-degree graduate and undergraduate programs.

Students are taught first by Beijing-based NYIT and Communication University of China faculty members and then have the option to complete their studies at NYIT's New York campuses. The campus includes NYIT-designed digital laboratories and a distance-learning, video-presence classroom connected to NYIT's New York campuses. NYIT students in Beijing are able to remotely operate equipment in NYIT's high-tech Home for Innovation, Visualization, and Exploration (HIVE) Center in New York with its motion capture, 3-D, and visualization tools.

The interconnectivity of the New York and Beijing programs enables students and faculty members to collaborate on creative projects and reviews. The NYIT-CUC programs are highly selective, and students chosen from throughout China had to meet both NYIT and CUC admissions standards, including the ability to take their courses in English. The curriculum and requirements of each program are identical to NYIT courses and programs offered in New York.

Sites
New York Tech offers M.B.A. programs in conjunction with JUFE in Nanchang, Shanghai, and Shenzhen.

Canada
NYIT-Vancouver offers graduate degrees and has two campus locations: one in downtown Vancouver, in the heart of the financial district and close to many cultural venues, and the other in a suburban locale.

Bahrain (closed)
NYIT-Manama offered undergraduate and graduate degrees until 2014 in fields including business, computer graphics, engineering, and interior design.

Jordan (closed)
NYIT-Amman offered until 2013 undergraduate and graduate degrees in fields including business, computer graphics, engineering, and information technology.

Organization and administration
NYIT's undergraduate and graduate programs are divided into six schools and colleges. Collaboration among the schools and colleges is frequent, as mandated by a number of interdisciplinary degree programs and research centers.

Schools and Colleges
New York Tech comprises the following academic schools and colleges:
 School of Architecture and Design
 College of Art and Sciences
 College of Engineering and Computing Sciences
 School of Health Professions
 School of Management
 College of Osteopathic Medicine

The now-defunct Ellis College of NYIT was created as an online division operating under the university's mission to provide career-oriented professional education and access to opportunity. In the fall of 2008, NYIT phased out its Ellis College branch.

Academics
In 2015, NYIT was ranked 14th in New York State by average professor salaries. 95% of faculty at NYIT hold their doctorate or other terminal degree. NYIT holds full accreditation in over 50 academic areas. Nationally, fewer than 100 colleges and universities match this achievement. As the liberal arts and sciences college of NYIT, NYIT's College of Art and Sciences is committed to serving not only the students who pursue their degrees in this college, but all NYIT undergraduates who depend on CAS for developing foundational academic skills and completing general education and other critical pieces of their education. As of 2015, the College of Arts and Sciences at NYIT offers 28 undergraduate and five graduate degree programs in departments including Behavioral Sciences, Communication Arts, Fine Arts, Interdisciplinary Studies, English and Speech, Mathematics, Physics, Social Sciences, Urban Administration and Life Sciences. The College of Arts and Sciences is home to NYIT's undergraduate Core Curriculum.

In 2016, the National Security Agency and the Department of Homeland Security designated NYIT as a National Center of Academic Excellence in Cyber Defense Education.

Core curriculum
Since fall 2010, all undergraduates must complete the Core Curriculum. NYIT's core curriculum was created to provide undergraduate students with an outcomes-oriented education that will prepare them for today's workforce.

Demographics
The student body consists of nearly 9,000 graduate and undergraduate students and around 1,000 academic faculty. The student body at NYIT is 52% male and 48% female.

Libraries

The New York campuses include four libraries:
 George and Gertrude Wisser Memorial Library, 
 Art and Architecture Library at Education Hall, 
 College of Osteopathic Medicine Library,
 1855 Broadway Library,

Access to the collection of books, periodicals and journals is open to registered NYIT students and alumni. Onsite use of special collections is also available to visiting students and researchers. NYIT collections include more than 100,000 books, 200 databases, 13,000 ebooks, and videos.

Rankings

Nationally, NYIT was ranked 151-160 by QS World University Rankings in 2020.

U.S. News & World Report ranks NYIT 22nd among universities in the North for 2022.

In 2015, NYIT's MBA program was ranked #1 in the United States in terms of salary-to-debt ratio. According to the survey by SoFi, graduates of NYIT's MBA program make an average of $126,068 per year, and have an average debt of $50,308.

NYIT was ranked 24th on Payscale.com's list of Best Value College in NY State (20-year ROI), in 2015.

In 2015, NYIT was ranked 14th in New York State by average professor salaries.

NYIT was ranked #44 by U.S. News & World Report Best Online Graduate Engineering Programs in 2016.

NYIT was ranked #23 by U.S. News & World Report Best Online Graduate Education Programs in 2015.

2012 Chronicle of Higher Education ranked NYIT as one of the best colleges in the nation to work for.

2009 Architect Magazine ranked NYIT one of the top four Building Technology Schools in the United States.

2009 Campus Safety survey ranked NYIT as the safest college in America.

In 2016, Niche ranked NYIT the second safest college campuses in New York State.

NYIT has been ranked by The New York Times as one of the more diverse colleges in the United States.

US News Best Colleges ranks NYIT as one of the Best Engineering Programs at schools where doctorate not offered.

PayScale ranks NYIT as a top school in the nation for Return on investment.

U.S. News & World Report ranks NYIT #40 in the nation for Physician Assistant program.

U.S. News & World Report ranks NYIT #164 in the nation for Physical Therapy.

U.S. News & World Report ranks NYIT #151 in the nation for Occupational Therapy program.

U.S. News & World Report placed NYIT's medical school on its lists of "Best Medical Schools: Research" and "Best Medical Schools: Primary Care" in 2013.

NYIT was featured on Washington Monthly's 2014 Best Bang for the Buck Rankings, a national list of schools that help non-wealthy students attain marketable degrees at affordable prices.

NYIT was featured on Washington Monthly's 2014 Master's Universities Rankings - Research.

Study abroad
In addition to NYIT's auxiliary campuses in Canada, China and the Middle East, NYIT has degree partnerships with over a dozen Chinese universities, as well as with universities in France, Taiwan, Brazil, India and Turkey. NYIT also has student exchange programs with universities in Denmark, Netherlands, China, United Kingdom, India, Costa Rica, Germany, Brazil and France.

Admissions

U.S. News & World Report describes New York Institute of Technology's admissions process as "selective".

NYIT received 10,010 first-year applications from prospective undergraduate students for the Class of 2020. NYIT students represent nearly all 50 U.S. states and 112 countries. For the undergraduate freshman class that entered its New York campuses in Fall 2012, NYIT drew 6,769 applications and enrolled 1,005. The undergraduate transfer class that enrolled in 2012 engendered 1,625 applications and 497 enrolled. As of 2022, NYIT reported average SAT scores of their admitted students as 574 for English, Reading, and Writing and 594 for Math, giving an average combined score of 1168. The average composite ACT score was 21, and the average high-school GPA was 3.4. NYIT's undergraduate acceptance rate was 65% in Fall 2012. For the undergraduate freshman class that entered its New York campuses in Fall 2014, NYIT received 8,394 applications, and its undergraduate acceptance rate was 64%. NYIT's undergraduate acceptance rate for the undergraduate transfer class that enrolled in 2014 was 57%.

Eight hundred eighty-three new graduate students beyond medical students enrolled in fall 2012. As of 2015, NYIT's graduate schools have acceptance rates of 7% to the New York Institute of Technology College of Osteopathic Medicine, 11% to the New York Institute of Technology School of Health Professions, 32% to the New York Institute of Technology School of Architecture and Design, 41% to the New York Institute of Technology College of Arts and Sciences, 49% to the New York Institute of Technology School of Education, 65% to the New York Institute of Technology School of Management, and 66% to the New York Institute of Technology School of Engineering and Computing Sciences.

In the 2012–2013 academic year, NYIT ranked 13th amongst US Master's Universities by total number of enrolled international students.

Accreditation

Overall accreditation and charter
 Commission on Higher Education of the Middle States Association of Colleges and Schools (all campuses)
 New York Institute of Technology is chartered by the Board of Regents of the University of the State of New York

Academic program accreditations
NYIT is accredited by the Commission on Higher Education of the Middle States Association of Colleges and Schools, and:
 Accreditation Board for Engineering and Technology, Inc.
 Accreditation Review Commission on Education for the Physician Assistant
 American Osteopathic Association
 Association for Childhood Education International
 Association for Educational Communications and Technology
 Commission on Accreditation in Physical Therapy Education
 Commission on Collegiate Nursing Education
 Council for Interior Design Accreditation
 National Architectural Accrediting Board, Inc.
 National Council for Accreditation of Teacher Education
 The Accreditation Council for Occupational Therapy Education of the American Occupational Therapy Association
 ACPHA/CHRIE program accreditation.
 Association to Advance Collegiate Schools of Business (all campuses).
 New York State Board of Regents, State Education Department, Office of the Professions (Nursing Education).
 Academy of Nutrition and Dietetics, Accreditation Council for Education in Nutrition and Dietetics.

Campus-specific accreditations, licensures, and approvals
NYIT-China is accredited by the Ministry of Education of China.

NYIT-United Arab Emirates is accredited by the Ministry Of Higher Education & Scientific Research of UAE.

NYIT-Canada is accredited by the Ministry of Advanced Education of British Columbia.

NYIT-Bahrain was accredited by the Ministry of Higher Education and Scientific Research of Bahrain, as well as the Ministry of Higher Education of Kuwait.

NYIT-Jordan was accredited by the Ministry of Higher Education and Scientific Research of Jordan.

Research
The Office of Sponsored Programs and Research works with faculty members to apply for funding to support research programs. Each year, NYIT receives well over $20 million in research support from external sources. To date, NYIT has received funding from public, private, and government agencies, including among others:

 National Institutes of Health
 National Science Foundation 
 New York State Department of Health 
 New York State Education Department 
 U.S. Department of Defense 
 U.S. Health Resources and Services Administration 
 U.S. Department of Commerce
 U.S. Department of Energy

In 1968, Federal government awarded $3 million in grants to NYIT for computer research. Researchers at the New York Institute of Technology Computer Graphics Lab created the tools that made entirely 3D CGI films possible. Among NYIT CG Lab's innovations was an eight-bit paint system to ease computer animation. NYIT CG Lab was regarded as the top computer animation research and development group in the world during the late 70s and early 80s.

In 1978, the digital noise reducer invented by William E. Glenn, earned NYIT its first television Emmy award. Glenn directed NYIT's former Science and Technology Research Center in Florida, where he also developed his invention. The digital noise reducer received a patent in 3-D technology in 1979.

In 1995, the School of Engineering took first place in the U.S. Department of Energy's Clean Air Road Rally. The student engineering team spent three years designing and building the high-performance hybrid electric car that beat out 43 other vehicles.

In 2007, NYIT received $500,000 in federal funding to develop a "green print" initiative to research alternative fuel technology and determine its carbon footprint.

In 2008, NYIT received a grant from the U.S. Department of Energy to study the relationship between electric vehicles and renewable energy charging stations.  For $250,000, NYIT was able to install two solar carports (one at its Old Westbury campus and one at its Central Islip campus), convert two Toyota Priuses to plug-ins with extra battery capacity, and install data collection technology.  Each carport spans 4 parking spots, provides level 1 charging (110 volt) at each parking spot, and supports a 10 kW solar array.

NYIT's research on electric vehicles, solar energy, and their resulting environmental and grid impacts continues in partnership with the Long Island Power Authority and the Electric Power Research Institute. The study currently has NYIT Students participate in car-share program where they are able to drive the plug-in Priuses between their homes and the school campus.  The school plans to expand participation to faculty members as well.

Also in 2008, NYIT was awarded a $130,000 research contract by United Space Alliance to help NASA scientists design the crew module of the Orion spacecraft using 3-D motion capture technology.

In 2009, U.S. Health Resources and Services Administration awarded a $1 million grant to NYIT.

In 2010, NYIT and the Intrepid Sea, Air & Space Museum announced a new partnership to incorporate project-based learning for NYIT's undergraduate students with the reconstruction of an aircraft restoration tent on the deck of the aircraft carrier USS Intrepid through a design competition. Also in 2010, NYIT received a $1 million grant from National Science Foundation for interdisciplinary research on cyber-enabled learning.

In 2011, National Institutes of Health awarded NYIT a $1.8 million grant to study the link between heart failure and thyroid disease.

In 2013, National Science Foundation awarded NYIT a three-year multimillion dollars grant to establish a Research Experience for Undergraduates (REU) site to study the security of mobile devices and wireless networks.

NYIT and Peking University led a research project that was selected as one of six U.S.-China EcoPartnership programs intended to promote innovative models for collaboration between the United States and China on clean water and environmental sustainability. The team also included Wuhan University, the International Society for Water Solutions of the American Institute of Chemical Engineers (AIChE), and HDR, Inc., an industrial partner. The project ran from September 2013 through August 2015.

In 2015, NYIT was awarded a nearly $0.5 million grant from National Institutes of Health to develop an implantable wireless system to study the body's gastric and digestive systems.

NYIT's research on animals such as dinosaurs and giraffes is regularly featured on National Geographic. NYIT's research is also often featured on BBC.

A renewable energy park in Point Lookout, New York, features a self-reliant solar house designed by architecture, engineering and interior design students at New York Institute of Technology for the U.S. Department of Energy Solar Decathlon in 2007.

NYIT sponsors the Kids’ 3D Spaghetti Utensil Design Competition. NYIT sponsors many notable events and conferences related to academic programs every year, throughout the world. DARPA and United States Department of Homeland Security regularly headline NYIT's Annual Cybersecurity Conference.

Interdisciplinary graduate centers

New York Tech's academic centers focus on interdisciplinary research and bring together departments, faculty, and students for collaborations and exchanges of ideas.

In 1981, NYIT's Center for Robotics Research opened at the Old Westbury campus.

1998, NYIT's College of Osteopathic Medicine opened the Adele Smithers Parkinson's Disease Center. NYIT's College of Osteopathic Medicine uses 3-D motion capture technology to help doctors better identify mobility and stability problems in patients with Parkinson's disease.

The Center for Global Health opened in 2007. Students in medicine, allied health, and engineering have traveled to Haiti and Ghana, where they help deliver babies and provide fresh water as part of NYIT's Center for Global Health program.

The Center for Labor and Industrial Relations provides training and research into workplace related issues.

The Center for Gerontology and Geriatrics collaborates with the academic community, government, civic, professional and business groups, and funders.

In 2015, NYIT Center for Sports Medicine opened at the Old Westbury campus.

NYIT opened a cybersecurity center in Old Westbury, New York in 2017.

NYIT's faculty and students have conducted research with such institutions as the Cold Spring Harbor Laboratory, Brookhaven National Laboratory, Memorial Sloan-Kettering Cancer Center, Los Alamos National Laboratory, and other organizations around the world.

Research areas
NYIT conducts faculty-led and student-supported research in areas such as:
 Alternative energies
 Bioengineering
 DNA
 Educational technology
 Heart disease
 Parkinson's disease
 Robotics

NYIT faculty and students are also involved in other areas of research, including sustainable technology, cardiovascular health, epilepsy, blindness, staph infection, and cyber security, among others. NYIT has won several million dollars in grants from the National Institutes of Health and the National Science Foundation for research on disease and for cyber-learning.

Industry connections
NYIT maintains close ties to the industrial world. Many of these connections are made through NYIT's cooperative education and internship programs. For example, in 2017, NYIT opened a cybersecurity lab in Old Westbury, New York, the first lab on Long Island designated as a National Center of Academic Excellence in Cyber Defense by the National Security Agency and the Department of Homeland Security.

The Entrepreneurship & Technology Innovation Center for Industry-University Partnerships at NYIT is structured around a collaborative network of industry-university partnerships, connecting industry and academia, innovators and entrepreneurs, the Entrepreneurship and Technology Innovation Center (ETIC) is a catalyst for technological innovation, entrepreneurship, and economic development. The ETIC focuses on three technological drivers of economic growth in the New York metropolitan region:
 Information & Cybersecurity
 Energy & Green Technologies
 Bio-Engineering and Medical Devices
The Empire State Development Corporation has provided seed funding for the initiative, which is supported by the Long Island Regional Economic Development Council. An Advisory Board made up of members of industry, government, and the venture capital community, has agreed to help NYIT create the center and work on its three focus areas create a high-tech teaching and research environment.

Student life

Traditions
NYIT has few formal traditions, compared to many other universities, but has a rich culture of informal traditions and jargon. There are a few "big events" such as Commencement (graduation), but many smaller, decentralized activities sponsored by departments, labs, living groups, student activities, and ad hoc groups of NYIT community members united by common interests.

Housing
The Office of Residence Life and Off-Campus Housing at New York Institute of Technology caters for students living in residence halls and independently in housing off-campus.

Student government
NYIT's Student Government Association (SGA) is the official voice of the student body. The SGA advocates on behalf of student interests—academic, cultural, and social. It is charged with working with the college's faculty and administration to improve campus life. In addition, the SGA oversees the budgeting process for student clubs and organizations and supports a variety of campus-wide events.

Student media

LI News Tonight
LI News Tonight is a nightly television newscast produced on the Old Westbury campus as both a community service to Nassau and Suffolk counties and an internship opportunity where students can learn about careers in television news. For more than 25 years, college interns have covered breaking news and feature events alongside reporters and photographers from professional news stations, with their work appearing that evening on a nightly TV newscast aired on a Long Island cable station.

Globesville
Globesville is NYIT's student-run web channel. It is an online network of students that uses the power of social media to integrate NYIT campuses, students and alumni from across the globe. The Globesville team creates and collects video and features which focus on the activities, interests, and goals of the NYIT community.

Campus newspapers
On the Old Westbury campus, NYIT students produce The Campus Slate, the student-run newspaper founded in 1966. The Campus Slate conducted interviews with celebrities such as Oscar-nominated actress Diane Lane and The Beach Boys. On the Manhattan campus, students produce the NYIT Chronicle, a student-run newspaper founded in 2005. On the Central Islip campus, students produced the Campus Voice, a student-run newspaper founded in 1992.

NYIT Magazine
NYIT Magazine is the official magazine of New York Institute of Technology. The magazine features articles on topics relevant to alumni and the community, and includes news of events, research, sports coverage, and profiles as professor and alumni accomplishments. The magazine is published three times a year.

WNYT
Radio station WNYT was formed shortly after NYIT opened its Old Westbury campus in the mid-1960s, operating from studios located in Education Hall. The student-run station has alternately broadcast on campus via carrier current and closed circuit connections, and during the 1970s and early 1980s, it served as the audio for Cablevision's on-screen program guide. Today, WNYT is heard online, with Internet-based programming via RealAudio.

WNYT Radio broadcasts many of the NYIT Bears sports broadcasts, giving more exposure to the station.

Greek life

Fraternities 
Phi Iota Alpha
Alpha Chi Rho
Tau Kappa Epsilon
Iota Nu Delta
Zeta Beta Tau
Delta Sigma Phi
Delta Epsilon Psi
Alpha Phi Alpha
Zeta Eta
Upsilon Mu

Sororities
Alpha Sigma Tau
Zeta Phi Beta
Kappa Phi Gamma
Sigma Iota Alpha
Eta Chi Gamma

Coed
DiGamma Omega Xi

Dining services
NYIT has seven major dining halls across its campuses in New York State, as of 2015. NYIT has five dining halls on its Old Westbury campus, one on its Manhattan campus. A new dining hall is being built on NYIT's Old Westbury campus, as of 2015.

ROTC
NYIT has an ROTC program, including both Air Force Reserve Officers' Training Corps and Army Reserve Officers Training Corps.

Athletics 

New York Tech (NYIT) athletic teams are known as the Bears. The institute was a member of the Division II level of the National Collegiate Athletic Association (NCAA), primarily competing in the East Coast Conference (ECC; originally called as the New York Collegiate Athletic Conference (NYCAC) until after the 2005–06 academic year) from 1989–90 until their last season of competition in the 2019–20 school year before the institute announced its suspension until further notice.

NYIT sponsored an intercollegiate athletics program in 12 varsity teams. Men's sports included baseball, basketball, cross country, lacrosse, soccer and track & field; while women's sports included basketball, cross country, lacrosse, soccer, softball and track & field.

New York Tech's intercollegiate competitive sports teams, include its four-time NCAA Division II national champion lacrosse team. All of NYIT's teams compete in Division II. In 2019, NYIT became a College World Series team.

New York Tech announced in August 2020 that the Bears would suspend its NCAA Division II intercollegiate athletics for at least two years.

Notable people

Alumni

New York Institute of Technology has nearly 107,000 alumni around the world, as of 2020.

Those recently in the spotlight include Kevin O'Connor (D.O. '96), personal physician to Joe Biden; Karine Jean-Pierre (B.S. '98), press secretary for the Biden administration; and Claudia Coplein (D.O. '92), Tyson's first chief medical officer.

Many have gone into business and finance, including: Vincent L. Sadusky, Chief Executive Officer at Univision Communications Inc; John Antioco, CEO, Blockbuster Video, Chairman, Board of Directors, Red Mango; Richard J. Daly, CEO, Broadridge Financial Solutions; Linda Davila, Chairperson, First Vice President, Investments Merrill Lynch; Eli Wachtel, Managing Director, Bear Stearns; Gary S. Lynch, managing director, Marsh & McLennan Companies; Itzhak Fisher, executive vice president, Nielsen Holdings, he also founded and served as CEO of RSL Communications, an over $1.5-billion telecommunications company with over 2,500 employees in 22 countries; Steve Johnson, Director for Labor Relations at The Coca-Cola Company; Robert E. Evanson, President, McGraw-Hill Education; Jerry Romano, chairman, New York Emmy Awards; Monte N. Redman, CEO, Astoria Financial; Patricia McMahon, vice president and general manager at Northrop Grumman, and vice president and general manager at BAE Systems; Indera Rampal-Harrod, director of human resources, American Express; Roseann Stichnoth, executive vice president and head of the Financial Services Group at the Federal Reserve Bank of New York; Chen Ningning, self-made billionaire; and Matthew F. Calamari, Executive Vice President and Chief Operating Officer of Trump Organization.

Some alumni have entered academia, including: 
 Kyriacos A. Athanasiou, Chair of the Biomedical Engineering department at University of California, Davis; 
 Ken Pugh, professor at Yale University; 
 Jill Wruble, professor at Yale University; 
 Peter Ruggiero, professor at Columbia University; 
 Jeannie Liakaris, Assistant Dean at New York University; 
 Michael Patrick Meehan, professor at New York University; 
 Robert Cohen, professor at New York University;
 Manish Sharma, professor at Cornell University.

Alumni in science and technology include: Eric Cole, chief technology officer at McAfee and chief scientist at Lockheed Martin Corporation; Peter A. Eckstein, Senior Principal Engineer, Northrop Grumman Corporation. IEEE Board of Directors member, and 2016 IEEE President; Mark B. Berger, senior vice president and chief information officer, SWBC; Steven Wolk, chief technology officer, P. C. Richard & Son; Michael McCrackan, Research and Development Director, Kodak; Vincent Connare, font designer and former Microsoft employee, amongst his creations are the Comic Sans font, and the Trebuchet MS font; James Chemp, Director of engineering and energy, 7-Eleven; Philip Fasano, executive vice president and chief information officer at American International Group (AIG); and Patri Friedman, Software Engineer at Google.

Alumni in government include: Joseph Saladino, New York state assemblyman; Anthony Seminerio, politician; Averof Neofytou, Cypriot politician who has been President of the governing Democratic Rally (DISY) party since 2013. Former Minister of Communications and Works and Mayor of Polis Chrysochou; Andre Pierre, former Democratic mayor of North Miami; Rafael Piñeiro, First Deputy Commissioner of the New York City Police Department (NYPD); Brian M. McLaughlin, New York state assemblyman; Nicholas Estavillo, NYPD Chief of Patrol; Tom Cilmi, Suffolk County Legislator; Keith Kazmark, Mayor of Woodland Park, New Jersey; Abdulla Bin Butti, Chairman of Energy Authority and member of Abu Dhabi Executive Council; Abubakar Kabir Bichi, member of the Nigerian Federal House of Representatives and Thani Ahmed Alzeyoudi, Minister of Climate Change and Environment for the United Arab Emirates.

Many of NYIT's alumni have also gone into arts, journalism and entertainment. They include Carol Silva, TV news anchor; Lori Bizzoco, writer; Patti Ann Browne, TV News Anchor, Fox News; Jim Geoghan, Emmy-nominated executive producer of The Disney Channel's The Suite Life on Deck and the original The Suite Life of Zack and Cody; Emmy Award-winning broadcast journalists Judy Martin, Dana Arschin, and Ben Finley who is the Editorial Producer with “Anderson Cooper 360” and has produced for several CNN and PBS programs; Brian Kenny, ESPN SportsCenter Anchor; Candice Night, lead singer, Blackmore's Night; and Adam Pascal, actor, singer, and producer.

Alumni in sports include: Allison Baver, Olympic Speed Skating Medalist (Bronze, 2010); Don Cooper, head pitching coach, Chicago White Sox;  Jim Ferry (basketball), basketball coach; Sarah Fisher, race car driver; Joe Vasold, lacrosse player; Ray Giannelli, baseball player; Manix Auriantal, professional basketball player; Chris Algieri, professional boxer in the Light Welterweight division; Allen Watson, former Major League Baseball pitcher (member of 2000 World Series Champion New York Yankees); and Brian Brady (baseball), former right fielder in Major League Baseball who played for the California Angels.

Faculty

Reino Aarnio, architect
Lance Williams, graphics researcher 
Bernard Fryshman, physicist
Zeeshan Jawed Shah, filmmaker 
Ralph Guggenheim, video graphics designer
Jim Blinn, computer scientist known for his work as a computer graphics expert at NASA's Jet Propulsion Laboratory
Edwin Catmull, computer scientist and current president of Pixar Animation Studios and Walt Disney Animation Studios
James H. Clark, entrepreneur and computer scientist, founded companies, including Netscape Communications Corporation
Alvy Ray Smith, pioneer in computer graphics
Greg Panos, writer, futurist, educator
Mehrdad Izady, contemporary writer on ethnic and cultural topics, particularly the Greater Middle East, and Kurds
Lynn Rogoff, film and television producer, and stage playwright, theatre director and professor 
Ahmed Awad, computer scientist, invented the mouse dynamics biometric, a new technology that identifies a user's unique way of using a mouse.
Harvey Jerome Brudner, theoretical physicist/engineer
Sheldon D. Fields, scientist
Frank Genese, architect
Ernie Anastos, won 28 Emmy Awards and nominations, and was nominated for the Edward R. Murrow Award for excellence in writing
Pat Hanrahan, computer graphics researcher
Rebecca Allen, international artist 
Frederic Parke, creator of the first CG physically modeled human face
Carter Burwell, composer of film scores
Barbara, Lady Judge, Chairman Emeritus of the UK Atomic Energy Authority
David DiFrancesco, photoscientist, inventor, cinematographer, and photographer.
Jacques Stroweis, visual effects artist and computer scientist 
Andrew Glassner, American expert in computer graphics
Bruce Perens, computer programmer and advocate in the free software movement
Harry Hurwitz, film director, screenwriter, actor and producer
Morrie Yohai, food company executive best known for his creation of Cheez Doodles
Joel B. Snyder, served as the Institute of Electrical and Electronics Engineers president
W. Kenneth Riland, osteopathic physician (D.O.) whose patients included 37th president of the United States Richard Nixon and Nelson A. Rockefeller
Manfred Kirchheimer, documentary film maker
Ed Emshwiller, visual artist 
William E. Glenn, inventor known for his contributions to imaging technology. He was awarded 136 U.S. patents.
Melda N. Yildiz, two-time Fulbright Scholar.
Tom Duff, computer programmer
Franklin C. Crow, computer scientist
John Lewis, computer scientist
Richard "Buz" Cooper, MD, a hematologist/oncologist who founded University of Pennsylvania's Cancer Center.

Athletic coaches
Bob Malvagna
Ron Ganulin
David Sweder

Presidents and provosts

Benefactors 
NYIT financial supporters include:
Alexander P. de Seversky, namesake of NYIT's DeSeversky Mansion and DeSeversky Center
Cornelius Vanderbilt Whitney
Rockefeller family, namesake of the Rockefeller Auditorium and the Rockefeller Building on NYIT's Old Westbury campus.
Nelson Rockefeller, namesake of NYIT's Nelson A. Rockefeller Academic Center
Laurance Rockefeller
Henry Kissinger, National Security Advisor and United States Secretary of State.
Richard A. Cody, 31st Vice Chief of Staff of the United States Army.

Honorary degree recipients 
Steve Forbes, editor-in-chief and publisher of business magazine Forbes
Bill Gates, founder of Microsoft
Gail Wilensky, headed Medicare under the first president Bush
Patricia Horoho, 43rd U.S. Army Surgeon General and Commanding General of the U.S. Army Medical Command.
Frank Bisignano, Chairman and CEO of First Data
Graham Nash, two-time Rock and Roll Hall of Fame inductee
William Bratton, New York City Police Commissioner
Kareem Abdul-Jabbar, one of the 50 Greatest Players in NBA History.
Stanford R. Ovshinsky, prolific American inventor and scientist who had been granted well over 400 patents.
Christine K. Cassel, member of United States President's Council of Advisors on Science and Technology.

Commencement speakers
Notable commencement speakers include George Pataki, the 53rd governor of New York, and Sanjay Kumar, chairman and CEO of CA Technologies.

In popular culture
NYIT's campuses have been the backdrop for movies such as Arthur and Three Days of the Condor and TV shows including Gossip Girl and Four Weddings.

See also
Tubby the Tuba (1975 film), an animated feature film produced by NYIT.
The Works (film), a shelved film which was under development by NYIT. It would have been the first entirely 3D CGI film in history had it been finished.

References

External links

 
History of computing
Engineering universities and colleges in New York (state)
Technological universities in the United States
Private universities and colleges in New York City
Universities and colleges on Long Island
Universities and colleges in Manhattan
Schools in Nassau County, New York
Educational institutions established in 1910
1910 establishments in New York (state)
Science and technology in New York (state)
Universities and colleges in British Columbia